Lusaghbyur or Lusakhpyur may refer to:
Lusaghbyur, Aragatsotn, Armenia
Lusaghbyur, Lori, Armenia
Lusaghbyur, Shirak, Armenia